Elizabeth Frances Coxen née Isaac (1825–1906) was an Australian naturalist and meteorologist. Born in Gloucestershire, England, she emigrated to with her family to Sydney, Australia in 1839.  She was a collector of shells, insects and birds, as was her husband, Charles Coxen, and they donated many specimens to the Queensland Museum, where Elizabeth worked as curator. After her husband's death she became the first female elected a member of the Royal Society of Queensland.

She died in Brisbane on 11 August 1906 and was buried with her husband in the cemetery of Christ Church in Tingalpa. Her friends commissioned a plaque commemorating her at St John the Baptist Anglican Church at Bulimba. She is commemorated in the name of the land snail Spurlingia coxenae (now known as Spurlingia dunkiensis).

References

External links 

1825 births
1906 deaths
Australian naturalists
People from Gloucestershire (before 1904)
English emigrants to Australia
Australian curators
Conchologists
Australian women curators